Coralogix is a SaaS platform that analyzes log, metric, and security data in real-time and uses machine learning to streamline delivery and maintenance processes for software providers. It was founded in 2014 by Guy Kroupp, Ariel Assaraf, and Lior Redlus and has its headquarters in California, United States.

History 
Coralogix was founded in 2014 by Ariel Assaraf, Guy Kroupp, and Lior Redlus in Tel Aviv, Israel. Later, Kroupp exited the company and Yoni Farin joined as a co-founder in 2017. Matt Handler joined in 2018 as the president and chief operating officer (COO).

In 2016, Coralogix graduated from the Microsoft Accelerator in Tel Aviv.

In 2020, it released its Streama technology. The same year, it expanded in India to provide businesses with data storage capabilities using Amazon Web Services (AWS) regional support. It was also recognized as a 2020 Cool Vendor in Performance Analysis by Gartner and grew to 10 million users by the end of the year.

By September 2021, Coralogix had raised $96.2 million in investment from over ten investors.

Investments 
In 2014, Coralogix raised Pre-Seed funding from Nimrod Cohen, followed by a $1 million in a Seed funding round led by Janvest Capital Partners.

In 2016, it raised $5.2 million in an additional Seed funding round led by StageOne Ventures, with participation from Janvest Capital Partners and Moshe Litchtman.

In 2019, it raised $10 million in a Series A round from Aleph Venture Capital, 2B Angels, Janvest Capital Partners, and StageOne Ventures.

In 2020, it raised $25 million in a Series B round from Aleph Venture Capital, 2B Angels, O.G. Tech, StageOne Ventures, Red Dot Capital Partners, and Janvest Capital Partners.

In 2021, it raised $55 million in a Series C round from Greenfield Partners, StageOne Ventures, Janvest Capital Partners, Red Dot Capital Partners, Maor Ventures, O.G. Tech, and 2B Angels.

In 2022, it raised $142 million in a Series D funding round, led by private equity giant Advent International, alongside Brighton Park Capital.

References 

2014 establishments in California
Software companies based in California